Vinterland is the fifth studio by Swedish singer Sarah Dawn Finer. It was released on 13 November 2014. The album has been described as a "winter's album", and consists of many Christmas songs, just like the album Winterland which Sarah Dawn Finer released in 2010.

Track listing
Vinterland
Kanske nästa år
Jag tror det blir snö i natt
Håll mitt hjärta (duet with Samuel Ljungbladh)
Vinter (a translation of Tori Amos's Winter with personalised lyrics)
Ännu en jul
Från November till April
Valborg
Vintersaga
Jul, jul, strålande jul (duet with Stephen Simmonds)
Nyårslöfte
Sancta Lucia (Strålande helgonfé), duet with Malena Ernman)

Charts

References

2014 Christmas albums
Christmas albums by Swedish artists
Sarah Dawn Finer albums
Gospel Christmas albums
Swedish-language albums